Zvěstov is a municipality and village in Benešov District in the Central Bohemian Region of the Czech Republic. It has about 400 inhabitants.

Administrative parts
Villages and hamlets of Bořkovice, Hlohov, Laby, Libouň, Ondřejovec, Otradov, Roudný, Šlapánov, Vestec and Vlastišov are administrative parts of Zvěstov.

References

Villages in Benešov District